Manchester Ship Canal Co Ltd v United Utilities Water plc [2014] UKSC 40 is a UK enterprise law case, concerning water in the UK.

Facts

Manchester Ship Canal Co Ltd claimed UUW plc should not be allowed to discharge surface water and treated effluent into its canals without consent under the Water Industry Act 1991 section 117(5).

Judgment
The Supreme Court held that United Utilities Water plc was entitled to discharge water into the canals from sewer outfall which was in use from 1 December 1991 backwards.

Lord Sumption held that water going onto land was trespass unless authorised by statute. There is no express right in the WIA 1991 but it could be implied if necessary (not just convenient or reasonable) to effectually achieve the statutory purpose, that could not otherwise be achieved. 
There was a case potentially analogous in Durrant v Branksome Urban District Council [1897] 2 Ch 291 but that has to be rejected. Also WIA 1991 section 159 contains a power to lay pipes, which would authorise a discharge. Earlier legislation is implied into the corresponding provision of the Water Industry Act 1991.

Lord Toulson concurred, but would have held if needed there was no trespass.

Lord Neuberger held there would be a right to compensation before 1991.

See also

United Kingdom enterprise law

Notes

References

United Kingdom enterprise case law